Market Kitchen is a British cookery television programme, made by Optomen, that premiered on the Good Food channel in 2007.  Presented by Rachel Allen, Amanda Lamb, Matt Tebbutt, Tom Parker Bowles and Matthew Fort, the programme concentrates on seasonal cooking and features visits to a local market to obtain seasonal produce. The first series was presented from a customised kitchen in Borough Market and featured Tana Ramsay as one of its presenters.

In 2009, the programme incorporated the Local Food Hero competition, which had previously had its own series on UKTV Food. It will feature the winner of a competition to find Britain's best pudding, launched by Christopher Biggins in April 2010.  In 2010, spin-off, Market Kitchen's: Big Adventure, aired on Good Food.

References

External links
Official Good Food Market Kitchen site

UKTV original programming
British cooking television shows
2000s British cooking television series
2010s British cooking television series
2007 British television series debuts
2010 British television series endings
Television series by All3Media
English-language television shows